The 2016 Cleveland Indians season was the 116th season for the franchise and the 23rd season at Progressive Field. The Indians won the American League Central Division for the first time since 2007 and also beat the Boston Red Sox in the Division Series for their first playoff win in nine years. They defeated the Toronto Blue Jays in five games in the American League Championship Series before losing to the Chicago Cubs  in seven games after blowing a 3-1 series lead in the 2016 World Series. This was their first appearance in the World Series since 1997.

Regular season

Opening day starting lineup
Tuesday, April 5, 2016 vs Boston Red Sox

Starting Pitcher: Corey Kluber

April

The Cleveland Indians opened up their 2016 season with a three-game series against the Boston Red Sox at Progressive Field. Opening Day was scheduled for April 4, but was postponed due to a mixture of rain and snow until April 5.  The Indians lost the opener 6-2.  They would get their first win a day later, as newly acquired 1B Mike Napoli hit the go-ahead home run in a 7-6 victory over his former team.

The Indians struggled during the month of April, going just 10-11 during the month.  On April 24, SP Carlos Carrasco left a game with a hamstring injury.  He would miss the next six weeks.  Trevor Bauer, who started the year in the bullpen, would take Carrasco's spot in the rotation.  SP Josh Tomlin was a bright spot for April, as he went 3-0 throughout the month.

May

Outfielder Michael Brantley came back from a shoulder injury he suffered late in 2015.  He would only play 11 games before re-aggravating his shoulder.  He would not return the rest of the season.  The Indians won 12 of 17 games between May 2–20, to close to within two games of the division leading Chicago White Sox.  The Indians would take three of four in Chicago later in the month to take the division lead.  The team finished the month 16-3.

June

The Indians continued their success into June, as they would win their first six games of the month.  Later in the month, the Indians would win a franchise record 14 straight games from June 17 through July 1.  The Indians were a perfect 11-0 at home in June.  They spent the month battling with the Detroit Tigers, Kansas City Royals, and fading Chicago White Sox atop the AL Central.  The Indians finished the month two games ahead of Kansas City.

SP Danny Salazar, who went 5-0 with a 1.91 ERA and a .177 opponent's batting average, was named the American League Pitcher of the Month for June.  OF Tyler Naquin was named the AL Rookie of the Month after batting .338 with an AL-best 1.219 OPS.

July

The Indians won their game on July 1, 2-1 over the Toronto Blue Jays, in 19 innings - the longest game of the 2016 season - to extend their winning streak to 14 games, but it would end the next day with a 9-6 loss to the Blue Jays.  The Indians would maintain a 5-7 game lead over the Detroit Tigers  throughout much of July.  However the team struggled near the end of the month and the lead slipped down to 4 games.  Adding to the struggle was an injury to C Yan Gomes, who would not return until the final game of the season.

The Indians were active at the trade deadline.  On July 31, they acquired RP Andrew Miller from the New York Yankees for four prospects including OF Clint Frazier and P Justus Sheffield, widely considered two of the top four prospects in the Indians' farm system.  The Indians also had a deal on the table for Milwaukee Brewers C Jonathan Lucroy, but Lucroy exercised his no-trade clause and vetoed the trade to Cleveland.  He would later be traded to the Texas Rangers.

On July 5, SP Danny Salazar and SS Francisco Lindor were named to the All Star team.  On July 8, SP Corey Kluber was also named to the team as an injury replacement. OF Tyler Naquin was named the AL Rookie of the Month for the second straight month.

August
The Indians struggled in early August, going just 3-6 in their first nine games.  Their lead over the Tigers decreased to just 2 games.  However, On August 11, the team opened an 11-game home stand - its longest of the season - that would put them on the winning track.  The Indians swept a four-game series from the Anaheim Angels to open up the home stand and took two out of three games from the Toronto Blue Jays to end the home stand. The Blue Jays series, which was believed to be a potential playoff preview, featured three one-run games including a walk-off inside-the-park home run by OF Tyler Naquin.  The Indians' lead over Detroit was back to 7 games by August 22.

The Indians would then go on a west-coast trip that saw them go 2-5, and score one run or less in six of the seven games.  However, the team returned home to sweep the Minnesota Twins to end the month.  On August 31, the team acquired OF Coco Crisp from the Oakland Athletics for cash considerations.  The acquisition of Crisp added outfield depth for the pennant race and postseason run.

September/October
The Indians won six of their first eight games in September to maintain a sizable lead over the Detroit Tigers.  However, the team's rotation, widely believed to be their biggest strength, suffered two major injuries during the month.  All-Star SP Danny Salazar left the game on September 9 with a strained elbow, resulting in a 3-4 week recovery time.  On September 17, SP Carlos Carrasco left the game with a broken hand as the result of a line-drive.  This injury ended Carrasco's season.  The Indians would put the Tigers away in September by winning two of three September 16–18.  On September 26, the Indians clinched the division title - the team's first since 2007 -  with a win over the Tigers.

The Indians would end the season with a record of 94-67, earning the No. 2 seed in the American League.

Roster

Season standings

American League Central

American League Wild Card

Record against opponents

Game log

|- style="text-align:center; background:#bbb;"
| — || April 4 || Red Sox ||colspan="8" | Postponed (rain). Makeup date: April 5. 
|- style="background:#fbb;"
| 1 || April 5 || Red Sox || 2–6 || Price (1–0) || Kluber (0–1)|| – || 34,493 || 0–1 ||L1
|- style="background:#bfb;"
| 2 || April 6 || Red Sox || 7–6 || McAllister (1–0)|| Tazawa (0–1)  ||  Allen (1) || 10,298 || 1–1 ||W1
|- style="background:#bbb;"
| — || April 7 || Red Sox ||colspan="9" |  Postponed (rain). Makeup date: August 15.   
|- style="background:#bfb;"
| 3 || April 8 || @ White Sox || 7–1 || Salazar (1–0)|| Danks (0–1)|| — || 38,019 || 2–1 ||W2
|- style="background:#fbb;"
| 4 || April 9 || @ White Sox || 3–7 || Sale (2–0) || Shaw (0–1) || — || 20,192 || 2–2 ||L1
|- style="background:#bbb;"
| — || April 10 || @ White Sox ||colspan="8" |  Postponed (rain). Makeup date: May 23 (Game 1).
|- style="background:#fbb;"
| 5 || April 12 || @ Rays || 1–5 || Cedeño (1–0)  || Kluber (0–2) || — || 10,283 || 2–3 ||L2
|- style="background:#bfb;"
| 6 || April 13 || @ Rays || 4–1 || Carrasco (1–0) || Smyly (0–2) || Allen (2) || 10,117 || 3–3 ||W1
|- style="background:#bfb;"
| 7 || April 14 || @ Rays || 6–0 || Salazar (2–0) || Archer (0–3) || — || 10,715 || 4–3 ||W2
|- style="background:#fbb;"
| 8 || April 15 || Mets || 5–6 || Colón (1–1) || Anderson (0–1)  || Familia (3) || 15,365 || 4–4 ||L1
|- style="background:#bfb;"
| 9 || April 16 || Mets || 7–5 || Tomlin (1–0) || Harvey (0–3) || Allen (3) || 20,165 || 5–4 ||W1
|- style="background:#fbb;"
| 10 || April 17 || Mets || 0–6 || Matz (1–1) || Kluber (0–3) || — || 17,621 || 5–5 ||L1
|- style="background:#bfb;"
| 11 || April 19 || Mariners || 3–2 || Carrasco (2–0) ||  Miley (0–2) || Allen (4) || 9,393 || 6–5 ||W1
|- style="background:#fbb;"
| 12 || April 20 || Mariners || 1–2 || Walker (1–0) || Salazar (2–1) || Cishek (2) || 9,980 || 6–6 ||L1
|- style="background:#fbb;"
| 13 || April 21 || Mariners || 7–10 (10)|| Zych (1–0) || Allen (0–1) || Cishek (3) || 11,525 || 6–7 ||L2
|- style="background:#bfb;"
| 14 || April 22 || @ Tigers || 2–1 || Tomlin (2–0) || Verlander (1–2) || Allen (5) || 25,086 || 7–7 ||W1
|- style="background:#bfb;"
| 15 || April 23 || @ Tigers || 10–1 || Kluber (1–3) || Sánchez (2–2)  || — || 31,163 || 8–7 ||W2
|- style="background:#bfb;"
| 16 || April 24 || @ Tigers || 6–3 || Bauer (1–0) || Greene (1–2) || Allen (6) || 31,947 || 9–7 ||W3
|- style="background:#fbb;"
| 17 || April 25 || @ Twins || 3–4 || Jepsen (1–3) || McAllister (1–1) || — || 17,503 || 9–8 ||L1
|- style="background:#fbb;"
| 18 || April 26 || @ Twins || 5–6 || Jepsen (2–3) || Allen (0–2) || — || 17,493 || 9–9 ||L2
|- style="background:#bfb;"
| 19 || April 27 || @ Twins || 6–5 || Tomlin (3–0) || Berríos (0–1) || Allen (7) || 17,746 || 10–9 ||W1
|- style="background:#fbb;"
| 20 || April 29 || @ Phillies || 3–4  (11)|| Hernandez (1–1) || Allen (0–3) || — || 18,677 || 10–10 ||L1
|- style="background:#fbb;"
| 21 || April 30 || @ Phillies || 3–4 || Bailey (1–0) || Hunter (0–1) || Gómez (8) || 23,636 || 10–11 ||L2
|-

|- style="background:#fbb;"
| 22 || May 1 || @ Phillies || 1–2 || Velasquez (5–2) || Salazar (2–2)  || Neris (1) || 23,809 || 10–12 ||L3
|- style="background:#bfb;"
| 23 || May 3 || Tigers || 7–3 || Tomlin (4–0) || Verlander (2–3) || — || 11,022 || 11–12 ||W1
|- style="background:#bfb;"
| 24 || May 4 || Tigers || 4–0 || Kluber (2–3) || Sánchez (3–3) || — || 8,766 || 12–12 ||W2
|- style="background:#bfb;"
| 25 || May 5 || Tigers || 9–4 || Bauer (2–0) || Fulmer (1–1) || — || 10,350 || 13–12 ||W3
|- style="background:#bfb;"
| 26 || May 6 || Royals || 7–1 || Salazar (3–2) || Ventura (2–2) || — || 13,587 || 14–12 ||W4
|- style="background:#fbb;"
| 27 || May 7 || Royals || 0–7 || Kennedy (4–2) || Anderson (0–2) || — || 17,302 || 14–13 ||L1
|- style="background:#bfb;"
| 28 || May 8 || Royals || 5–4 || Tomlin (5–0) || Vólquez (3–3) || Allen (8) || 14,463 || 15–13 ||W1
|- style="background:#fbb;"
| 29 || May 9 || @ Astros || 1–7 || Fiers (3–1) || Kluber (2–4) || — || 20,222 || 15–14 ||L1
|- style="background:#bfb;"
| 30 || May 10 || @ Astros || 4–0 || Bauer (3–0) || Devenski (0–2) || — || 23,976 || 16–14 ||W1
|- style="background:#fbb;"
| 31 || May 11 || @ Astros || 3–5 (16) || Feliz (1–0) || Anderson (0–3) || — || 24,453 || 16–15 ||L1
|- style="background:#bfb;"
| 32 || May 13 || Twins || 7–6 || McAllister (2–1) || May (0–2) || Allen (9) || 17,803 || 17–15 ||W1
|- style="background:#fbb;"
| 33 || May 14 || Twins || 3–6 || Santana (1–2) || Kluber (2–5) || — || 15,428 || 17–16 ||L1
|- style="background:#fbb;"
| 34 || May 15 || Twins || 1–5 || Duffey (1–2) || Bauer (3–1) || — || 13,236 || 17–17 ||L2
|- style="background:#bfb;"
| 35 || May 16 || Reds || 15–6 || Hunter (1–1) || Lamb (0–1) || — || 12,184 || 18–17 ||W1
|- style="background:#bfb;"
| 36 || May 17 || Reds || 13–1 || Salazar (4–2) || Simón (1–4) || — || 13,095 || 19–17 ||W2
|- style="background:#bfb;"
| 37 || May 18 || @ Reds || 8–7 (12) || Allen (1–3) || Sampson (0–1) || Otero (1) || 22,815 || 20–17 ||W3
|- style="background:#bfb;"
| 38 || May 19 || @ Reds || 7–2 || Tomlin (6–0) || Cotham (0–3) || — || 21,173 || 21–17 ||W4
|- style="background:#bfb;"
| 39 || May 20 || @ Red Sox || 4–2 || Kluber (3–5) || Buchholz (2–4) || Allen (10) || 37,354 || 22–17 ||W5
|- style="background:#fbb;"
| 40 || May 21 || @ Red Sox || 1–9 || Kelly (2–0) || Bauer (3–2) || — || 37,254 || 22–18 ||L1
|- style="background:#fbb;"
| 41 || May 22 || @ Red Sox || 2–5 || Porcello (7–2) || Salazar (4–3) || Kimbrel (12) || 36,021 || 22–19 ||L2
|- style="background:#fbb;"
| 42 || May 23 || @ White Sox || 6–7 || Latos (6–1) || Clevinger (0–1) || Robertson (12) ||  || 22–20 ||L3
|- style="background:#bfb;"
| 43 || May 23 || @ White Sox || 5–1 || Anderson (1–3) || Johnson (0–2) || — ||  18,323 || 23–20 ||W1
|- style="background:#bfb;"
| 44 || May 24 || @ White Sox || 6–2 || Tomlin (7–0) || Sale (9–1) || — || 21,550 || 24–20 ||W2
|- style="background:#bfb;"
| 45 || May 25 || @ White Sox || 4–3 || Kluber (4–5) || Quintana (5–4) || Allen (11) || 22,561 || 25–20 ||W3
|- style="background:#fbb;"
| 46 || May 27 || Orioles || 4–6 || Bundy (1–1) || McAllister (2–2) || Britton (13) || 21,054 || 25–21 ||L1
|- style="background:#bfb;"
| 47 || May 28 || Orioles || 11–4 || Salazar (5–3) || Jiménez (2–6) || — || 21,110 || 26–21 ||W1
|- style="background:#fbb;"
| 48 || May 29 || Orioles || 4–6 || Tillman (7–1) || Manship (0–1) || Britton (14) || 18,565 || 26–22 ||L1
|- style="background:#fbb;"
| 49 || May 30 || Rangers || 2–9 || Holland (4–4) || Tomlin (7–1) || Ramos (1) || 14,514 || 26–23 ||L2
|- style="background:#fbb;"
| 50 || May 31 || Rangers || 3–7 || Lewis (5–0) || Kluber (4–6) || Dyson (6) || 10,428 || 26–24 ||L3
|-

|- style="background:#bfb;"
| 51 || June 1 || Rangers || 5–4 (11) || Gorzelanny (1–0) || Claudio (1–1) || — || 10,524 || 27–24 ||W1
|- style="background:#bfb;"
| 52 || June 2 || Royals || 5–4 || Hunter (2–1) || Soria (2–2) || — || 11,131 || 28–24 ||W2
|- style="background:#bfb;"
| 53 || June 3 || Royals || 6–1 || Salazar  (6–3) || Vólquez (5–5) || — ||  24,753 || 29–24 ||W3
|- style="background:#bfb;"
| 54 || June 4 || Royals || 7–1 || Tomlin (8–1) || Kennedy (4–4) || — || 23,258 || 30–24 ||W4
|- style="background:#bfb;"
| 55 || June 5 || Royals || 7–0 || Kluber (5–6) || Young (2–6) || — || 16,747 || 31–24 ||W5
|- style="background:#bfb;"
| 56 || June 6 || @ Mariners || 3–1 || Bauer (4–2) || Paxton (0–2) || Allen (12) || 15,824 || 32–24 ||W6
|- style="background:#fbb;"
| 57 || June 7 || @ Mariners || 1–7 || Miley (6–2) || Anderson (1–4)  || — ||  16,944 || 32–25 ||L1
|- style="background:#fbb;"
| 58 || June 8 || @ Mariners || 0–5 ||  Walker (3–6) || Carrasco (2–1) || — || 15,337 || 32–26 ||L2
|- style="background:#bfb;"
| 59 || June 9 || @ Mariners || 5–3 || Otero (1–0) || Benoit (1–1) || Allen (13) || 19,901 || 33–26 ||W1
|- style="background:#bfb;"
| 60 || June 10 || @ Angels || 6–2 || Kluber (6–6) ||  Santiago (3–4) || — || 39,487 || 34–26 ||W2
|- style="background:#fbb;"
| 61 || June 11 || @ Angels || 3–4 || Salas (3–2) || Shaw (0–2) || — || 38,296 || 34–27 ||L1
|- style="background:#bfb;"
| 62 || June 12 || @ Angels || 8–3 || Salazar (7–3) || Huff (0–2) || — || 36,383 || 35–27 ||W1
|- style="background:#fbb;"
| 63 || June 13 || @ Royals || 1–2 || Vólquez (6–6) || Carrasco (2–2) || Davis (18) || 31,269 || 35–28 ||L1
|- style="background:#fbb;"
| 64 || June 14 || @ Royals || 2–3 || Soria (3–2) || Shaw (0–3) || — || 29,293 || 35–29 ||L2
|- style="background:#fbb;"
| 65 || June 15 || @ Royals || 4–9 || Kennedy (5–5) || Kluber (6–7) || — || 33,546 || 35–30 ||L3
|- style="background:#bfb;"
| 66 || June 17 || White Sox || 3–2 || Allen (2–3) || Jones (2–2) || — || 27,912 || 36–30 ||W1
|- style="background:#bfb;"
| 67 || June 18 || White Sox || 13–2 || Salazar (8–3) || Shields (2–9) || — || 31,066 || 37–30 ||W2
|- style="background:#bfb;"
| 68 || June 19 || White Sox || 3–2 (10) || Otero (2–0) || Robertson (0–1) || — || 25,269 || 38–30 ||W3
|- style="background:#bfb;"
| 69 || June 20 || Rays || 7–4 || Shaw (1–3) || Ramírez (7–5) || Allen (14) || 13,811 || 39–30 ||W4
|- style="background:#bfb;"
| 70 || June 21 || Rays || 6–0 || Kluber (7–7) || Snell (0–2) || — || 15,629 || 40–30 ||W5
|- style="background:#bfb;"
| 71 || June 22 || Rays || 6–1 || Bauer (5–2) || Archer (4–10) || — || 21,216 || 41–30 ||W6
|- style="background:#bfb;"
| 72 || June 24 || @ Tigers || 7–5 || Salazar (9–3) || Zimmermann (9–4) || — || 37,886 || 42–30 ||W7
|- style="background:#bfb;"
| 73 || June 25 || @ Tigers || 6–0 || Carrasco (3–2) || Sánchez (4–8) || — || 39,028 || 43–30 ||W8
|- style="background:#bfb;"
| 74 || June 26 || @ Tigers || 9–3 || Tomlin (9–1) || Verlander (7–6)  || — || 36,502 || 44–30 ||W9
|- style="background:#bfb;"
| 75 || June 27 || @ Braves || 8–3 || Bauer (6–2) || Jenkins (0–1) || — || 15,538 || 45–30 ||W10
|- style="background:#bfb;"
| 76 || June 28 || @ Braves || 5–3 || Kluber (8–7) || Vizcaíno (1–3) || Allen (15) || 19,206 || 46–30 ||W11
|- style="background:#bfb;"
| 77 || June 29 || @ Braves || 3–0 || Salazar (10–3) || De La Cruz (0–1) || Allen (16) || 16,600 || 47–30 ||W12
|- style="background:#bfb;"
| 78 || June 30 || @ Blue Jays || 4–1 || Carrasco (4–2) || Dickey (5–9) || Allen (17) || 41,365 || 48–30 ||W13
|-

|- style="background:#bfb;"
| 79 || July 1 || @ Blue Jays || 2–1  (19) || Bauer (7–2) || Barney (0–1) || — || 45,825 || 49–30 ||W14
|- style="background:#fbb;"
| 80 || July 2 || @ Blue Jays || 6–9 || Grilli (2–2) || Otero (2–1) || Osuna (16) || 46,197 || 49–31 ||L1
|- style="background:#fbb;"
| 81 || July 3 || @ Blue Jays || 1–17 || Happ (11–3) || Kluber (8–8) || — || 45,962 || 49–32 ||L2
|- style="background:#bfb;"
| 82 || July 4 || Tigers || 5–3 || Manship (1–1) || Rondón (2–1) || Allen (18) || 34,163 || 50–32 ||W1
|- style="background:#bfb;"
| 83 || July 5 || Tigers || 12–1 || Carrasco (5–2) || Sánchez (5–9) || — || 19,448 || 51–32 ||W2
|- style="background:#fbb;"
| 84 || July 6 || Tigers || 2–12 || Fulmer (9–2) || Tomlin (9–2) || — || 24,098 || 51–33 ||L1
|- style="background:#fbb;"
| 85 || July 7 || Yankees || 4–5 || Nova (6–5) || Bauer (7–3) || Chapman (17) || 23,848 || 51–34 ||L2
|- style="background:#bfb;"
| 86 || July 8 || Yankees || 10–2 || Kluber (9–8) || Green (1–2) || — || 34,045 || 52–34 ||W1
|- style="background:#fbb;"
| 87 || July 9 || Yankees || 6–7 (11) ||  Chapman (3–0) || Hunter (2–2) || — || 32,951 || 52–35 ||L1
|- style="background:#fbb;"
| 88 || July 10 || Yankees || 7–11 || Eovaldi (7–6) || Carrasco (5–3) || — || 29,089 || 52–36 ||L2
|- style="text-align:center; background:#bbcaff;"
| colspan="10" | 87th All-Star Game in San Diego, California
|- style="background:#bfb;"
| 89 || July 15 || @ Twins || 5–2 || Carrasco (6–3) || Santana (3–8) || Allen (19) || 27,074 || 53–36 ||W1
|- style="background:#fbb;"
| 90 || July 16 || @ Twins || 4–5 (11) || May (1–2) || Colón (0–1) || — || 29,447 || 53–37 ||L1
|- style="background:#bfb;"
| 91 || July 17 || @ Twins || 6–1 || Tomlin (10–2) || Gibson (2–6) || — || 25,692 || 54–37 ||W1
|- style="background:#fbb;"
| 92 || July 18 || @ Royals || 3–7 || Hochevar (2–2) || Shaw (1–4) || Davis (20) || 38,042 || 54–38 ||L1
|- style="background:#bfb;"
| 93 || July 19 || @ Royals || 7–3 || Salazar (11–3) || Flynn (1–1) || — || 31,144 || 55–38 ||W1
|- style="background:#bfb;"
| 94 || July 20 || @ Royals || 11–4 ||Carrasco (7–3)|| Kennedy (6–8) || — || 33,455 || 56–38 ||W2
|- style="background:#fbb;"
| 95 || July 22 || @ Orioles || 1–5 || Bundy (3–2) || Bauer (7–4) || Britton (31) || 39,358 || 56–39 ||L1
|- style="background:#fbb;"
| 96 || July 23 || @ Orioles || 2–5 || Gausman (2–7) || Tomlin (10–3) || Britton (32) || 31,946 || 56–40 ||L2
|- style="background:#fbb;"
| 97 || July 24 || @ Orioles || 3–5 || O'Day (3–1) || Allen (2–4) || — || 37,821 || 56–41 ||L3
|- style="background:#bfb;"
| 98 || July 26 || Nationals || 7–6 || Shaw (2–4) || Papelbon (2–4) || — || 23,711 || 57–41 ||W1
|- style="background:#fbb;"
| 99 || July 27 || Nationals || 1–4 || Strasburg (14–1) || Carrasco (7–4) || Treinen (1) || 26,607 || 57–42 || L1
|- style="background:#bfb;"
| 100 || July 29 || Athletics || 5–3 || Anderson (2–4) || Graveman (7–7) || Allen (20) || 33,134 || 58–42 ||W1
|- style="background:#bfb;"
| 101 || July 30 || Athletics || 6–3 || Tomlin (11–3) || Overton (1–2) || — || 32,850 || 59–42 ||W2
|- style="background:#bfb;"
| 102 || July 31 || Athletics || 8–0 || Kluber (10–8) || Gray (5–10) || — || 23,739 || 60–42 ||W3
|-

|- style="background:#fbb;"
| 103 || August 1 || Twins || 5–12 || Berríos (2–1) || Salazar (11–4) || — || 15,018 || 60–43 ||L1
|- style="background:#fbb;"
| 104 || August 2 || Twins || 6–10 || Pressly (6–5) || Carrasco (7–5) || — || 15,835 || 60–44 ||L2
|- style="background:#fbb;"
| 105 || August 3 || Twins || 5–13 || Duffey (6–8) || Bauer (7–5) || — || 17,176 || 60–45 ||L3
|- style="background:#bfb;"
| 106 || August 4 || Twins || 9–2 || Otero (3–1) || Santiago (10–5) || — || 19,193 || 61–45 ||W1
|- style="background:#fbb;"
| 107  || August 5 || @ Yankees || 7–13 || Pineda (6–10) || Tomlin (11–4) || — || 39,252 || 61–46 ||L1
|- style="background:#bfb;"
| 108 || August 6 || @ Yankees || 5–2 || Kluber (11–8) || Sabathia (6–9) || Miller (10) || 37,264 || 62–46 ||W1
|- style="background:#fbb;"
| 109 || August 7 || @ Yankees || 2–3 || Tanaka (8–4) || Carrasco (7–6) || Betances (2) || 39,720 || 62–47 ||L1
|- style="background:#bfb;"
| 110 || August 9 || @ Nationals || 3–1 || Bauer (8–5) || Scherzer (12–7) || Allen (21) || 30,978 || 63–47 ||W1
|- style="background:#fbb;"
| 111 || August 10 || @ Nationals || 4–7 || Gonzalez (8–9) || Tomlin (11–5) || Melancon (32) || 30,185 || 63–48 ||L1
|- style="background:#bfb;"
| 112 || August 11 || Angels || 14–4 || Kluber (12–8) || Chacín (2–6) || — || 16,652 || 64–48 ||W1
|- style="background:#bfb;"
| 113 || August 12 || Angels || 13–3 || Carrasco (8–6) || Skaggs (1–1) || — || 27,014 || 65–48 ||W2
|- style="background:#bfb;"
| 114 || August 13 || Angels || 5–1 || Clevinger (1–1) || Shoemaker (6–13) || — || 30,409 || 66–48 ||W3
|- style="background:#bfb;"
| 115 || August 14 || Angels || 5–4 || Bauer (9–5) || Weaver (8–10) || Allen (22) || 18,979 || 67–48 ||W4
|- style="background:#fbb;"
| 116 || August 15 || Red Sox || 2–3 || Pomeranz (9–9) || Tomlin (11–6) || Kimbrel (20) || 19,174 || 67–49 ||L1
|- style="background:#bfb;"
| 117 || August 16 || White Sox || 3–1 || Kluber (13–8) || Quintana (9–9) || Allen (23) || 13,857 || 68–49 ||W1
|- style="background:#fbb;"
| 118 || August 17 || White Sox || 7–10 || Turner (0–2) || Allen (2–5) || Robertson (30) || 14,371 || 68–50 ||L1
|- style="background:#bfb;"
| 119 || August 18 || White Sox || 5–4 || Miller (7–1) || Turner (1–2) || — || 12,982 || 69–50 ||W1
|- style="background:#bfb;"
| 120 || August 19 || Blue Jays || 3–2 || Manship (2–1) || Osuna (2–2) || — || 30,665 || 70–50 ||W2
|- style="background:#fbb;"
| 121 || August 20 || Blue Jays || 5–6 || Biagini (4–2) || Tomlin (11–7) || Osuna (28) || 33,604 || 70–51 ||L1
|- style="background:#bfb;"
| 122 || August 21 || Blue Jays || 3–2 || Clevinger (2–1) || Cecil (1–7) || Allen (24) || 26,696 || 71–51 ||W1
|- style="background:#bfb;"
| 123 || August 22 || @ Athletics || 1–0 || Carrasco (9–6) || Dull (5–4) || Miller (11) || 10,114 || 72–51 ||W2
|- style="background:#fbb;"
| 124 || August 23 || @ Athletics || 1–9 || Manaea (5–8) || Salazar (11–5) || — || 13,141 || 72–52 ||L1
|- style="background:#fbb;"
| 125 || August 24 || @ Athletics || 1–5 || Graveman (10–8) || Bauer (9–6) || — || 12,795 || 72–53 ||L2
|- style="background:#fbb;"
| 126 || August 25 || @ Rangers || 0–9 || Hamels (14–4) || Tomlin (11–8) || — || 23,768 || 72–54 ||L3
|- style="background:#bfb;"
| 127 || August 26 || @ Rangers || 12–1 || Kluber (14–8) || Pérez (8–10) || — || 31,853 || 73–54 ||W1
|- style="background:#fbb;"
| 128 || August 27 || @ Rangers || 0–7 || Griffin (6–3) || Carrasco (9–7) || — || 44,944 || 73–55 ||L1
|- style="background:#fbb;"
| 129 || August 28 || @ Rangers || 1–2 || Holland (6–6) || Salazar (11–6) || — || 35,225 || 73–56 ||L2
|- style="background:#bfb;"
| 130 || August 29 || Twins || 1–0 (10) || McAllister (3–2) || Kintzler (0–1) || — || 11,327 || 74–56 ||W1
|- style="background:#bfb;"
| 131 || August 30 || Twins || 5–4 || Otero (4–1) || Wimmers (0–1) || Miller (12) || 11,937 || 75–56 ||W2
|- style="background:#bfb;"
| 132 || August 31 || Twins || 8–4 || Kluber (15–8) || Dean (1–5) || Shaw (1) || 11,811 || 76–56 ||W3
|-

|- style="background:#bfb;"
| 133 || September 2 || Marlins || 6–2 || Carrasco (10–7) || Cashner (4–11) || — || 24,415 || 77–56 ||W4
|- style="background:#bfb;"
| 134 || September 3 || Marlins || 8–3 || Bauer (10–6) || Fernández (13–8) || — || 27,483 || 78–56 ||W5
|- style="background:#bfb;"
| 135 || September 4 || Marlins || 6–5 || Allen (3–5) || Rodney (2–4) || — || 25,910 || 79–56 ||W6
|- style="background:#fbb;"
| 136 || September 5 || Astros || 2–6 || Fiers (10–6) || Clevinger (2–2) || — || 13,062 || 79–57 ||L1
|- style="background:#fbb;"
| 137 || September 6 || Astros || 3–4 || Hoyt (1–0) || Kluber (15–9) || Giles (9) || 11,023 || 79–58 ||L2
|- style="background:#bfb;"
| 138 || September 7 || Astros || 6–5 || Carrasco (11–7) || Fister (12–11) || Allen (25) || 12,063 || 80–58 ||W1
|- style="background:#bfb;"
| 139 || September 8 || Astros || 10–7 || Bauer (11–6) || Paulino (0–1) || Allen (26) || 15,275 || 81–58 ||W2
|- style="background:#bfb;"
| 140 || September 9 || @ Twins || 5–4 || Colón (1–1) || Duffey (8–11) || Allen (27) || 20,173 || 82–58 ||W3
|- style="background:#fbb;"
| 141 || September 10 || @ Twins || 1–2 (12) || Chargois (1–1) || Colón (1–2) || — || 23,584 || 82–59 ||L1
|- style="background:#bfb;"
| 142 || September 11 || @ Twins || 7–1 || Kluber (16–9) || Berríos (2–6) || — || 20,301 || 83–59 ||W1
|- style="background:#fbb;"
| 143 || September 12 || @ White Sox || 4–11 || González (4–6)|| Carrasco (11–8)|| — || 12,588 || 83–60 ||L1
|- style="background:#fbb;"
| 144 || September 13 || @ White Sox || 1–8 || Quintana (12–10) || Bauer (11–7) || — || 15,588 || 83–61 ||L2
|- style="background:#bfb;"
| 145 || September 14 || @ White Sox || 6–1 || Tomlin (12–8) || Rodon (7–9) || — || 15,808 || 84–61 ||W1
|- style="background:#fbb;"
| 146 || September 15 || @ White Sox || 1–2 || Robertson (5–3) || Shaw (2–5) || — || 14,190 || 84–62 ||L1
|- style="background:#bfb;"
| 147 || September 16 || Tigers || 11–4 || Kluber (17–9) || Fulmer (10–7) || — || 29,137 || 85–62 ||W1
|- style="background:#bfb;"
| 148 || September 17 || Tigers || 1–0 (10) || Miller (8–1) || Wilson (4–5) || — || 26,654 || 86–62 ||W2
|- style="background:#fbb;"
| 149 || September 18 || Tigers || 5–9 || Norris (3–2) || Bauer (11–8) || Rodríguez (43) || 21,382 || 86–63 ||L1
|- style="background:#bfb;"
| 150 || September 20 || Royals || 2–1 || Miller (9–1) || Flynn (1–2) || — || 13,623 || 87–63 ||W1
|- style="background:#bfb;"
| 151 || September 21 || Royals || 4–3 || Kluber (18–9) || Kennedy (11–10) || Allen (28) || 13,888 || 88–63 ||W2
|- style="background:#bfb;"
| 152 || September 22 || Royals || 5–2 || Otero (5–1) || Gee (7–9) || Allen (29) || 15,253 || 89–63 ||W3
|- style="background:#bfb;"
| 153 || September 23 || White Sox || 10–4 || Bauer (12–8) || González (4–8) || — || 18,937 || 90–63 ||W4
|- style="background:#fbb;"
| 154 || September 24 || White Sox || 1–8 || Quintana (13–11) || Anderson (2–5) || — || 32,088 || 90–64 ||L1
|- style="background:#fbb;"
| 155 || September 25 || White Sox || 0–3 || Rodon (8–10) || Tomlin (8–10) || Robertson (36) || 24,118 || 90–65 ||L2
|- style="background:#bfb;"
| 156 || September 26 || @ Tigers || 7–4 || Miller (10–1) || Farmer (0–1) || Allen (30) || 24,981 || 91–65 ||W1
|- style="background:#fbb;"
| 157 || September 27 || @ Tigers || 0–12 || Verlander (16–8) || Clevinger (2–3) || — || 25,696 || 91–66 ||L1
|- style="background:#fbb;"
| 158 || September 28 || @ Tigers || 3–6 (5) || Hardy (1–0) || Colón (1–3) || — || 26,934 || 91–67 ||L2
|- style="text-align:center; background:#bbb"
| — || September 29 || @ Tigers ||colspan="8" | Cancelled (rain).
|- style="background:#bfb;"
| 159 || September 30 || @ Royals || 7–2 || Merritt (1–0) || Ventura (11–12) || — || 24,741 || 92–67 ||W1
|- style="background:#bfb;"
| 160 || October 1 || @ Royals || 6–3 || Clevinger (3–3) || Strahm (1–2) || Allen (31) || 28,569 || 93–67 ||W2
|- style="background:#bfb;"
| 161 || October 2 || @ Royals || 3–2 || Tomlin (13–9) || Kennedy (11–11) || Allen (32) || 29,475 || 94–67 ||W3
|-

|- style="text-align:center;"
| Legend:       = Win       = Loss       = PostponementBold = Indians team member

Postseason

American League Division Series

By virtue of winning the AL Central, the Indians were placed in the American League Division Series against the AL East champion Boston Red Sox.  Because the Indians had the better regular season record, they had home field advantage in the best-of-five series.

The Indians won Game 1, 5-4, thanks in part to a three-run 3rd inning that featured home runs by Roberto Perez, Jason Kipnis, and Francisco Lindor, the first postseason home run in each of their careers.  The Indians' pitching was led by starter Trevor Bauer and relievers Andrew Miller and Cody Allen, who each threw over 40 pitches, to clinch the victory.  Indians' ace Corey Kluber went seven shutout innings in Game 2, a 6-0 Indians' win.  The big blow for the Indians was a Lonnie Chisenhall 3-run home run.

The Indians and Red Sox then had two days off - a regularly scheduled travel day and rainout as the remnants of Hurricane Matthew affected Boston.  When the teams got back to baseball on October 10, Josh Tomlin and the Indians' bullpen would lead the team to a 4-3 victory and a sweep of the division series.  The Red Sox mounted a rally in the bottom of the 9th, but Cody Allen was able to close out the game.  The Indians would advance to the American League Championship Series for the first time since 2007.

American League Championship Series

The Indians would face the Toronto Blue Jays in the American League Championship Series, again having home-field advantage.  The Indians would win a pair of pitchers' duels in Games 1 and 2, 2-0 and 2-1.  In Game 1, the Indians scored their only runs on a Francisco Lindor home run in the sixth inning.  Indians' starter Corey Kluber went six shutout innings and relievers Andrew Miller and Cody Allen completed the shutout.  In Game 2, Carlos Santana's leadoff home run in the second off of Toronto pitcher J. A. Happ gave the Indians a 1−0 lead, but the Blue Jays tied it in the third with a Josh Donaldson RBI double.  Cleveland responded with a Lindor RBI single in the third. Starter Josh Tomlin, along with Bryan Shaw, Miller, and Allen, would make that 2-1 lead stand up the rest of the game.

The series shifted to Toronto for Game 3.  Indians' starter Trevor Bauer left the game in the bottom of the inning due to a bloody finger as a result of being cut from a drone before the series started. The bullpen answered the call and gave up two runs in more than 8 innings of work.  Led by Mike Napoli and Jason Kipnis home runs, the Indians won this game 4-2, to take a 3-0 series lead.

World Series

Postseason game log

|- style="text-align:center; background:#bfb;"
| 1 || October 6 || Red Sox || 5–4 || Miller (1–0) || Porcello (0–1) || Allen (1) || 37,763 || 1–0 || Box
|- style="text-align:center; background:#bfb;"
| 2 || October 7 || Red Sox || 6–0 || Kluber (1–0) || Price (0–1) || — || 37,842 || 2–0 || Box
|- style="text-align:center; style="background-color:#bbb;"
| — || October 9 || @ Red Sox || colspan="8" | Postponed (rain). Makeup date: October 10.
|- style="text-align:center; background-color:#bfb;"
| 3 || October 10 || @ Red Sox || 4–3 || Tomlin (1–0)  || Buchholz (0–1) || Allen (2) || 39,530  || 3–0 || Box
|- style="text-align:center; style="background-color:#933;"

|-style="text-align:center; background:#bfb;"
| 1 || October 14 || Blue Jays || 2–0 || Kluber (1–0) ||Estrada (0–1) || Allen (1) || 37,727 || 1–0 || Box
|- style="text-align:center; style="background-color:#933;"
|-style="text-align:center; background:#bfb;"
| 2 || October 15 || Blue Jays || 2–1 || Tomlin (1–0) || Happ (0–1) || Allen (2) || 37,870 || 2–0 || Box 
|- style="text-align:center; style="background-color:#933;"
|-style="text-align:center; background:#bfb;"
| 3 || October 17 || @ Blue Jays || 4–2 || Shaw (1–0) ||Stroman (0–1)  || Miller (1) || 49,507 || 3–0 || Box 
|- style="text-align:center; style="background-color:#933;"
|-style="text-align:center; background:#fbb;"
| 4 || October 18 || @ Blue Jays || 1–5 || Sanchez (1–0) || Kluber (1–1) || — || 49,142 || 3–1 || Box 
|- style="text-align:center; style="background-color:#933;" 
|-style="text-align:center; background:#bfb;"
| 5 || October 19 || @ Blue Jays || 3–0 || Shaw (2–0) || Estrada (0–2)|| Allen (3) || 48,800 || 4–1 || Box 
|- style="text-align:center; style="background-color:#933;"

|-style="text-align:center; background:#bfb;"
| 1 || October 25 || Cubs || 6–0 || Kluber (1–0) || Lester (0–1) || — || 38,091 || 1–0 || Box
|- style="text-align:center; style="background-color:#933;" 
|-style="text-align:center; background:#fbb;"
| 2 || October 26 || Cubs || 1–5 || Arrieta (1–0) || Bauer (0–1) || — || 38,172 || 1–1 || Box
|-style="text-align:center; background:#bfb;"
| 3 || October 28 || @ Cubs || 1–0  || Miller (1–0) || Edwards (0–1) || Allen (1) || 41,703 || 2–1 || Box
|- style="text-align:center; style="background-color:#933;" 
|-style="text-align:center; background:#bfb;"
| 4 || October 29 || @ Cubs || 7–2  || Kluber (2-0) || Lackey (0-1) || — || 41,706 || 3–1 || Box
|- style="text-align:center; style="background-color:#933;" 
|-style="text-align:center; background:#fbb;"
| 5 || October 30 || @ Cubs || 2–3 || Lester (1–1)  || Bauer (0–2) || Chapman (1) || 41,711 || 3–2 || Box
|- style="text-align:center; style="background-color:#933;" 
|-style="text-align:center; background:#fbb;"
| 6 || November 1 || Cubs || 3–9 || Arrieta (2–0) || Tomlin (0–1) || – || 38,116 || 3–3 || Box
|- style="text-align:center; style="background-color:#933;" 
|-style="text-align:center; background:#fbb;"
| 7 || November 2 || Cubs || 7–8 (10) || Chapman (1–0) || Shaw (0–1) || Montgomery (1) || 38,104 || 3–4 || Box
|-style="text-align:center; background:#;"
| colspan="11" | 
|-

|- style="text-align:center;"
| Legend:       = Win       = Loss       = PostponementBold = Indians team member

Postseason rosters

| style="text-align:left" |
Pitchers: 24 Andrew Miller 27 Bryan Shaw 28 Corey Kluber 37 Cody Allen 43 Josh Tomlin 47 Trevor Bauer 52 Mike Clevinger 53 Jeff Manship 56 Cody Anderson 61 Dan Otero
Catchers: 10 Yan Gomes 38 Chris Gimenez 55 Roberto Pérez 
Infielders: 1 Michael Martínez 11 José Ramírez 12 Francisco Lindor 22 Jason Kipnis 26 Mike Napoli 
Outfielders: 4 Coco Crisp 6 Brandon Guyer 8 Lonnie Chisenhall 20 Rajai Davis 30 Tyler Naquin
Designated hitters: 41 Carlos Santana
|- valign="top"

| style="text-align:left" |
Pitchers: 24 Andrew Miller 27 Bryan Shaw 28 Corey Kluber 34 Zach McAllister 37 Cody Allen 43 Josh Tomlin 47 Trevor Bauer 52 Mike Clevinger 53 Jeff Manship 54 Ryan Merritt 56 Cody Anderson 61 Dan Otero
Catchers: 10 Yan Gomes 55 Roberto Pérez 
Infielders: 1 Michael Martínez 11 José Ramírez 12 Francisco Lindor 22 Jason Kipnis 26 Mike Napoli
Outfielders: 4 Coco Crisp 6 Brandon Guyer 8 Lonnie Chisenhall 20 Rajai Davis 30 Tyler Naquin
Designated hitters: 41 Carlos Santana
|- valign="top"

| style="text-align:left" |
Pitchers: 24 Andrew Miller 27 Bryan Shaw 28 Corey Kluber 31 Danny Salazar 34 Zach McAllister 37 Cody Allen 43 Josh Tomlin 47 Trevor Bauer 52 Mike Clevinger 53 Jeff Manship 54 Ryan Merritt 61 Dan Otero
Catchers: 10 Yan Gomes 55 Roberto Pérez 
Infielders: 1 Michael Martínez 11 José Ramírez 12 Francisco Lindor 22 Jason Kipnis 26 Mike Napoli
Outfielders: 4 Coco Crisp 6 Brandon Guyer 8 Lonnie Chisenhall 20 Rajai Davis 30 Tyler Naquin
Designated hitters: 41 Carlos Santana
|- valign="top"

Farm system

LEAGUE CHAMPIONS: Akron

References

External links

2016 Cleveland Indians Season Official Site 
2016 Cleveland Indians season at Baseball Reference

Cleveland Guardians seasons
Cleveland
Cleveland Indians
American League Central champion seasons
American League champion seasons